Jarvis Filimalae (born 20 April 2003), is a Samoan international footballer who plays as a midfielder for Lupe o le Soaga and Havelock North. 

Filimalae started playing football at the age of seven. In 2017 he was awarded a scholarship to study at Hastings Boys' High School in New Zealand. In New Zealand he plays for Havelock North Wanderers.

In 2020 he was selected to the Lupe o le Soaga team for the 2020 OFC Champions League.

He was part of the Samoa national under-17 football team which contested the 2018 OFC U-16 Championship qualifying stage in Tonga.
In June 2019 he was named to the Samoa national football team for the 2019 Pacific Games. In 2022, he joined Fluminense Peru academy.

Statistics

Club

Notes

International

References

External links
 

2003 births
Living people
People educated at Hastings Boys' High School
Samoan footballers
Samoan expatriate footballers
Samoa international footballers
Association football midfielders
Samoan expatriate sportspeople in New Zealand
Expatriate association footballers in New Zealand
Samoa youth international footballers